W. B. Lawson was a house pseudonym used for some of the stories of Diamond Dick and Diamond Dick Jr.

Among the  authors using the name were:

 St George Henry Rathborne
 George C. Jenks
 Theodore Dreiser